Jeddayel (also spelled Geddayel or Jadayel) is a town in the Byblos District of the Keserwan-Jbeil Governorate, Lebanon. It is located 4 km north of Byblos. Its inhabitants are predominantly Greek Orthodox and Maronite Christians. Its population is about 1,500.

Demographics
Jeddayel is located in a predominantly Christian Greek Orthodox area know locally as “Qornet Al Rom”, containing seven Christian Greek Orthodox towns: Mounsef, AlRihani, Jeddayel, Barbara, Chikhane, Gharzouz, and Hosrayel.

Churches
There exist three churches in Jeddayel, because the martyr Dometius of Persia is the patron saint of a large part of the population. Two churches, a Maronite and another Greek Orthodox, are named 'Mar Doumit'.   The third church is in honour of Notre Dame.

Events and festivals
'Mar Doumit feast day', and 'Summer goodbye' are yearly feasted in Jeddayel. Both events end by an open village dinner.
Also, Christmas is widely celebrated in Jeddayel through Christmas decorations, special theater shows, and Papa Noël who makes personal appearances.

Municipality
There was no municipality in Jeddayel before 2016. In January 2016 town's residents called all concerned to take the appropriate measures to improve the security in the town.  Accordingly Mr Nader Abi Shadid and  several others worked to establish a Municipality in Jeddayel to prevent and curb suspicious activities. In May 2016 town's resident elected Dr. Boutros Boulos as the first town mayor. See List of town without municipalities in Lebanon.

Geography
The town is located on a hill overlooking the Mediterranean Sea. Its area is 2 km². It is surrounded by plantations of carobs, olive trees, and various vegetable crops. Thus several carob presses and olive oil mills are located within the village.

Climate
Jeddayel has a Mediterranean climate. The prevailing wind comes from the West-Southwest causes a maritime gateway and occasionally the advent of cloud cover. At night, land breeze rushes Wadi Jeddayel and brings to the region a relatively cold and slightly damp weather.

Climate
Jeddayel has a Hot-summer mediterranean climate (Csa).

See also
Catholic Church in Lebanon

References

Populated places in Byblos District
Eastern Orthodox Christian communities in Lebanon
Maronite Christian communities in Lebanon
Christian cities in Lebanon